Frank Owen (1893–1968) was an American author, novelist and anthologist.  He wrote 10 novels in the 1930s under the pseudonym Roswell Williams, a name which is sometimes erroneously listed as his real name.  Owen is best known for his oriental fantasy short stories, many of which appeared in the magazine Weird Tales.  Owen also co-wrote several children's collections with his wife, Ethel Owen.

Bibliography

Novels and collections
 Coat Tales from the Pockets of the Happy Giant (with Ethel Owen, collection, 1927)
 The Dream Hills of Happy Country (with Ethel Owen, collection, 1928)
 House Mother (1929)
 Pale Pink Porcelain (1929)
 The Wind that Tramps the World (1929)
 The Purple Sea (collection, 1930)
 Windblown Stories (with Ethel Owen, collection, 1930)
 The Professional Virgin (as Roswell Williams, 1931)
 Della Wu, Chinese Courtesan (collection, 1931)
 Rare Earth (1931)
 The Blue Highway (with Ethel Owen, collection, 1932)
 "Vagabond Lady" (as Roswell Williams, 1934)
 Madonna of the Damned (as Roswell Williams, 1935)
 Lovers of La Fab (as Roswell Williams, 1935)
 Dark Destiny (as Roswell Williams, 1936)
 A Husband for Kutani (collection, 1938)
 The Scarlet Hill (1941)
 The Porcelain Magician (1948)

Anthologies

 Murder for Millions (1946)
 Fireside Mystery Book (1947)
 Teen-age Mystery Stories (1948)

Notes

References

External links

  (mainly as 'Owen, Frank, 1893–' without '1968', previous page of browse report)

 Roswell Williams (pseudonym) at WorldCat

20th-century American novelists
American fantasy writers
American male novelists
American children's writers
1893 births
1968 deaths
20th-century American male writers